Pimlico is a district in London.

Pimlico may also refer to:

Places

England
 Pimlico, Hertfordshire, a hamlet in Hertfordshire, north of Bedmond
 Pimlico, Lancashire, a village to the north of Clitheroe

Australia
 Pimlico, New South Wales
 Pimlico, Queensland, a suburb of Townsville, Australia 
 Pimlico State High School, in Townsville, Australia

Ireland
 Pimlico, Dublin, an area of Dublin's southside inner-city

United States
 Pimlico, Baltimore, Maryland, a neighborhood
 Pimlico Race Course, a horse racetrack in Baltimore, Maryland; home of the Preakness Stakes and the Pimlico Special
 Pimlico, South Carolina, a census-designated place

Music
 "Pimlico", a 1996 song by David Devant & His Spirit Wife

Other
 Pimlico tube station in London's Pimlico district
 Pimlico (publishing imprint), an imprint of publisher Random House

See also
 Passport to Pimlico, a 1949 Ealing comedy